Gayle Tierney is an Australian politician. She has been a Labor Party member of the Victorian Legislative Council since November 2006, representing Western Victoria Region.

Tierney has served as the Minister for Agriculture, Minister for Higher Education and Minister for Training and Skills since June 2022, November 2018 and November 2016 respectively. She was also the Minister for Corrections between 2016 and 2018.

Early life 
Tierney studied politics and Asian studies at Flinders University, before entering the trade union movement.  

Notably, Tierney was the first woman to become State Secretary of the traditionally male-dominated Vehicle Division of the Automotive, Metals and Engineering Union (now part of the Australian Manufacturing Workers Union), serving in that role from 1993 to 2006, and serving as its Federal President from 2000 to 2006.

Political career 
Tierney entered politics at the 2006 state election.  

She has held various positions including Shadow Parliamentary Secretary for Employment from 2012 to 2014 and Cabinet Secretary in 2016.

On 9 November 2016, Tierney was appointed as Minister for Corrections and Minister for Training and Skills following the resignation of Steve Herbert.

Following the 2018 Victorian state election, Tierney was re-appointed as Minister for Training and Skills and appointed Minister of Higher Education.  

In 2020, Tierney was appointed Deputy Leader of the Government in the Legislative Council. In June 2022, she was additionally appointed as Minister for Agriculture.

Tierney is a member of the Labor Left faction of the Labor Party.

Personal life 
Tierney is married and has an adult son.

References

Australian Labor Party members of the Parliament of Victoria
Members of the Victorian Legislative Council
Labor Left politicians
Living people
Year of birth missing (living people)
Flinders University alumni
21st-century Australian politicians
Women members of the Victorian Legislative Council
21st-century Australian women politicians
Victorian Ministers for Agriculture